The 1892 United States presidential election in Michigan took place on November 8, 1892. All contemporary 44 states were part of the 1892 United States presidential election. Voters chose 14 electors to the Electoral College, which selected the president and vice president.

Uniquely, this remains the only presidential election where Michigan used the congressional district method of distributing electoral votes rather than the traditional winner-take-all system. The switch was made by the newly elected 1890 Democratic legislature, which had gained control of the state for the first time since before the Civil War. The change was an attempt at boosting Democratic candidate Grover Cleveland's chances of winning a second, nonconsecutive term, who had run in the previous election and won the popular vote, but lost in the electoral college. Controversial among Republicans, the party fought all the way to the Supreme Court in efforts to prevent it, though were unsuccessful. The split ultimately had no effect in Cleveland's victory, and the system was quickly repealed when Republicans regained control after the election. This is the only instance of Michigan splitting its electoral votes among multiple candidates. A law later passed in 1954 that prohibits faithless electors prevents a similar occurrence, barring a return to the district method.

Michigan was won by the Republican nominees, incumbent President Benjamin Harrison of Indiana and his running mate Whitelaw Reid of New York. The pair received nine of the state's electoral votes while the Democratic ticket earned five.

Cleveland became the first Democratic presidential candidate since Franklin Pierce in 1852 to get electoral votes from Michigan though it wouldn't send a full slate of Democratic electors to the Electoral College until Franklin Delano Roosevelt won the state in 1932.

Results

Results by county

See also
 United States presidential elections in Michigan

Notes

References

Michigan
1892
1892 Michigan elections